Skogsbo-Avesta IF is a Swedish football club located in Avesta.

Background
Skogsbo-Avesta IF currently plays in Division 5 Dalarna Södra which is the seventh tier of Swedish football. They play their home matches at the Klockarvallen in Avesta.

The club is affiliated to Dalarnas Fotbollförbund. Skogsbo-Avesta IF played in the 2011 Svenska Cupen but lost 0–4 at home to Sandvikens IF in the preliminary round.

Season to season

Footnotes

External links
 Skogsbo-Avesta IF – Official website
 Skogsbo-Avesta IF on Facebook

Football clubs in Dalarna County
1989 establishments in Sweden